James Hay may refer to:

James Hay (bishop) (died 1538), Scottish abbot and bishop
James Hay, 1st Earl of Carlisle (c.1580–1636), British noble
James Hay, 2nd Earl of Carlisle (1612–1660), British noble
James Hay, 15th Earl of Erroll (1726–1778), Scottish nobleman
James Hay, Lord Hay (1797–1815), British noble and soldier
James Hay (British Army officer) (died 1854), British Army officer of the Napoleonic Era
James Hay (cricketer) (1886-1936), New Zealand cricketer
James Hay (entrepreneur) (born 1950), Scottish born entrepreneur, chairman of JMH Group
James Hay (footballer) (1876–1940), footballer for Barnsley, Chesterfield Town and Stoke
James Hay (philanthropist) (1888–1971), New Zealand businessman, local politician and philanthropist
James Hay (politician) (1856–1931), U.S. Representative from Virginia
James Hay (singer) (1885–1958), Australian tenor in Gilbert and Sullivan operas
James Hay Partnership, a British financial services company
Jim Hay (1931–2018), ice hockey player
Jim Hay (rugby union), Scottish rugby union player
Jimmy Hay (1881–1940), Scottish football player
Sir James Shaw Hay (1839–1924), Governor of Gambia, Sierra Leone and the Bahamas
James Hay (dancer), soloist in the Royal Ballet

See also
James Hayes (disambiguation)